Antonia, Antónia, Antônia, or Antonía is a feminine given name and a surname. It is of Roman origin, used as the name of women of the Antonius family. Its meaning is "priceless", "praiseworthy" and "beautiful". Antonia is a Danish, Dutch, English, Faroese, Finnish, German, Italian, Norwegian, Polish, Romanian, Spanish, and Swedish name used in the United States, most of Canada, Mexico, Guatemala, Honduras, Nicaragua, El Salvador, Costa Rica, Western Panama, Cuba, Dominican Republic, Colombia, Venezuela, Guyana, Suriname, Ecuador, Peru, Chile, Bolivia, Argentina, Uruguay, Paraguay, Australia, New Zealand, Papua New Guinea, Indonesia, Philippines, Peninsular Malaysia, Singapore, India, Pakistan, Spain, Italy, Austria, Germany, Belgium, Netherlands, Poland, Romania, Bulgaria, Moldova, part of Serbia, Norway, Sweden, Finland, Denmark, Greenland, Estonia, Republic of Karelia, South Africa, Namibia, Botswana, Zimbabwe, Zambia, Malawi, Tanzania, Uganda, Kenya, South Sudan, Sudan, and Ethiopia.

Antónia is a Hungarian, Portuguese, and Slovak feminine form of Anton, Antal and António used in Hungary, Slovakia, Portugal, Brazil, Namibia, South Africa, Angola and Mozambique as well as parts of Romania. Antônia is a Portuguese feminine form of Antônio used in Portugal, Brazil, Namibia, South Africa, Angola and Mozambique. Antonía is an Icelandic feminine form of Antonie used in Iceland. Antonia is the feminine form of Antonios (Αντώνιος) and Antonis (Αντώνης) used mainly in Greece and Cyprus.

Variants
Anthonia – Danish, Finnish, Swedish
Antoaneta – Bulgarian
Antoinette – French
Antonela – Albanian
Antonella – Danish, Italian, Norwegian, Spanish, Swedish
Antoneta – Albanian
Antonette – English
Antonia – Albanian, Bulgarian, Croatian, Danish, Dutch, English, German, Georgian, Italian, Norwegian, Polish, Romanian, Russian, Spanish, Swedish
Ántonia – Bohemian
Antonía – Icelandic
Antònia – Catalan
Antónia – Hungarian, Portuguese, Slovak
Antônia – Brazilian Portuguese
Antonie – Czech, Danish, Norwegian, Swedish
Antonieta – Portuguese
Antonietta – Italian, Spanish
Antonija – Croatian, Latvian, Serbian, Slovene
Antonina – Italian, Polish
Antonine – Danish, Norwegian, Swedish
Antía – Galician
Nedda – Italian
Nela – Croatian, Czech, Slovak
Nettie – Danish, Dutch, English, Finnish, Norwegian, Swedish
Teuna – Dutch
Toini – Finnish
Toni – English
Toñi – Spanish
Tonia – English, Polish
Tonka – Croatian, Slovene
Tony – English
Tonya – English, Russian, Ukrainian
Tončica – Croatian (Dalmatian)
Tosia – Polish
Αντωνία (Antonia or Andonia) – Greek

Roman women
The name of any women of the Antonius family in Ancient Rome:
 Antonia (aunt of Mark Antony), the daughter of Marcus Antonius (orator)
 Antonia Hybrida Major, the first daughter of politician Gaius Antonius Hybrida she married the tribune Lucius Caninius Gallus
 Antonia Hybrida Minor, the second daughter of politician Gaius Antonius Hybrida, she married her cousin Mark Antony
 Antonia (wife of Vatinius), sister of Mark Antony, she married Publius Vatinius
Daughters of Mark Antony
 Antonia (wife of Pythodoros), married wealthy Greek Pythodoros of Tralles
 Antonia Major, grandmother of Roman Empress Valeria Messalina and Roman Emperor Nero
 Antonia Minor, mother of Roman Emperor Claudius and grandmother of Roman Emperor Caligula
 Iulla Antonia, maternal granddaughter of Octavia Minor and paternal granddaughter of Mark Anthony
 Antonia Tryphaena, granddaughter Pythodoros of Tralles, princess of Pontus
 Antonia Furnilla, mother of Marcia (mother of Trajan) and Marcia Furnilla
 Claudia Antonia, Roman princess, granddaughter of Antonia Minor and a daughter of Roman Emperor Claudius
 Antonia Clementiana, daughter of Roman Governor of Judea, Antonius Felix 
 Antonia Agrippina, a possible granddaughter of Roman Governor of Judea, Antonius Felix 
 Antonia Gordiana, daughter, sister and mother of Emperors Gordian I to III respectively
 Antonia and Alexander, Roman Catholic saints

Other people
 Antônia (footballer)
 Mother Antonia, Mexican nun
 Nina Antonia, British journalist and writer
 Antonia Ax:son Johnson, Swedish businesswoman
 Antonia of Baux, queen consort of Sicily
 Antonia Byatt, British novelist and poet
 Antonia Campbell-Hughes, Northern Irish actress
 Jane Antonia Cornish, British Contemporary classical music composer
 Antonia of Douro, descendant of emperor Wilhelm II of Germany
 Toni Garrn, (born Antonia Garrn), German model
 Antonia Göransson, Swedish footballer
 Antonia Iacobescu, Romanian singer also known as "Antonia"
 Antonia Kidman, Australian journalist and sister of Nicole Kidman
 Antonia Kinlay, British actress
 Antonia Lofaso, American celebrity chef and restaurateur
 Antonia of Luxembourg
 Antônia Melo
 Antonia Moraiti (born 1977), Greek water polo player
 Antonia Nava de Catalán (1779 – 1843), heroine of the Mexican War of Independence
 Antonia Novello, first female and Hispanic Surgeon General of the United States
 Antonia Papandreou, American engineer
 Antónia of Portugal, Portuguese princess
 Antonia Pozzi, Italian poet 
 Antonia Prebble, New Zealand actress
 Antonia Rados, Austrian television journalist
 Bahamadia, (born Antonia Reed), American hip-hop artist
 Antonia Scarpa, American film director and musician of Sicilian descent
 Antonia Stergiou (born 1985), Greek high jumper
 Antonia Thomas, British actress
 Antonia Wright, American reality television personality
 Susan Williams Antonia Stockard, birthname of Stockard Channing

Fictional people
 Antonia Ridderfjell, fictional character in the Bert Diaries comic book adaptions, cousin of Emilia Ridderfjell
 Antonia, heroine in the Gothic novel The Monk.
 Ántonia, a character within the novel My Ántonia.

Surname
Helena Antonia (1550–1595), bearded female court dwarf 
Jarchinio Antonia (born 1990), Curaçaoan footballer

See also

Antona (name)
Antonic
Antonida Asonova
Antonik
Antonin (name)
Antonina (name)
Antoñita (disambiguation), given name/nickname
Antoniu
Antoniya
Antonya Nelson
 Tonia (name)

Notes

Feminine given names
Danish feminine given names
Dutch feminine given names
English feminine given names
Faroese feminine given names
Finnish feminine given names
German feminine given names
Greek feminine given names
Hungarian feminine given names
Icelandic feminine given names
Italian feminine given names
Norwegian feminine given names
Polish feminine given names
Portuguese feminine given names
Romanian feminine given names
Slovak feminine given names
Spanish feminine given names
Swedish feminine given names